Evening Moods is the only studio album by the band RatDog, featuring former Grateful Dead guitarist and singer Bob Weir. Released on 26 September 2000, it consists of a number of new songs introduced by RatDog during the previous year and a Grateful Dead song, "Corrina". Grateful Dead drummer Mickey Hart makes a guest appearance on a few tracks. "Ashes and Glass" and "Two Djinn" are both included on Weir Here – The Best of Bob Weir.

Weir has continued to play tracks from the album with his band Bobby Weir & Wolf Bros. Furthermore, "Even So" has been played by Dead & Company on a few occasions, in remembrance of RatDog bassist Rob Wasserman, who frequently collaborated with Weir outside of the band.

Reception

In a review for AllMusic, Zac Johnson stated that the album "shouldn't disappoint hungry Deadheads," and noted that "the bluesy/folky/country/jazz feel of the Dead's live sets have been reborn in this incarnation."

Rob S. Turner of Jambands.com commented: "This is a fine release that should win over even the most anti-Weir Grateful Dead fans. And for those of us who have hung with him for all these years, this release is sweet, so very, very sweet!"

The Music Box's John Metzger remarked that, on Evening Moods, Weir "finally finds his voice and comes into his own." He stated: "This is his band. These are his songs. And with the exception of 'Corrina', the Grateful Dead machine had nothing to do with their formation." He concluded: "it's an album that both avid and casual Deadheads ought to celebrate."

Author Dean Budnick noted that, for the most part, the album "focuses on compositions debuted and developed by RatDog," and stated that it "may be Weir's strongest studio effort, with subtle accents providing equipoise to snarling leads."

In an article for The Washington Post, Mike Joyce wrote: "the music on Evening Moods doesn't sound as if it's coming from a toothless jam band. While Weir sometimes celebrates his love for vintage blues and rock with all the vocal power he can muster... the band's rhythm section... is never overshadowed for long."

The Marquee's Brandon Daviet stated that the album "ranks up there with the best of The Grateful Dead's studio excursions like Built To Last, Terrapin Station and of course Workingman’s Dead," and commented: "Weir... has firmly grasped what the majority of 'Deadheads', new and old, want."

Track listing

Credits

RatDog 
 Bob Weir - lead vocals, rhythm guitar, slide guitar
 Jeff Chimenti - keyboards, background vocals
 Mark Karan - lead guitar, background vocals
 Jay Lane - drums, background vocals
 Rob Wasserman - double bass

Additional personnel 
Kenny Brooks - saxophone on tracks 3, 7, 9
Eric Crystal - saxophone on tracks 3, 6, 7, 8, 9
Dave Ellis - baritone saxophone, tenor saxophone on tracks 3, 5
Mickey Hart - percussion on tracks 1, 6, 7
Matthew Kelly - harmonica on tracks 3, 8, 9
Robbie Kwock - trumpet on tracks 3, 7, 8, 9
Mike McGinn - guitar on tracks 1, 2, 6, 10
Marty Wehner - trombone on tracks 3, 7, 8, 9

Production 
Executive producer - Bob Weir
Producer - Mike McGinn and the Blotter Brothers
Recording engineer - Mike McGinn
Mixing - Tom Flye
Additional engineers - Mike Freitas, Justin Phelps and Kris Ziakas
Mastering - Joe Gastwirt
Management - Cameron Sears, Sirius Management
Publicity - Dennis McNally
Crew - Mike McGinn, A.J. Santella and Kris Ziakas
Package coordination - Cassidy Law
Art direction and design - Geoff Gans
Photography - Doug Menuez

References

RatDog albums
Bob Weir albums
2000 albums
Grateful Dead Records albums